William Ambrose "Cush" Cooney (April 7, 1883 – November 6, 1928) was a former Major League Baseball player. He played two seasons with the Boston Doves from 1909 to 1910.

Cooney made his Major League Baseball debut on September 22, 1909, against the Pittsburgh Pirates, relieving Lew Richie in the 6 inning with the Doves down 12–7. Cooney threw for four scoreless innings, giving up three hits and one base on balls.

References

External links

Boston Doves players
1883 births
1928 deaths
Baseball players from Boston
Major League Baseball pitchers
Major League Baseball outfielders
Major League Baseball shortstops
Haverhill Hustlers players
Lowell Tigers players
Lynn Leonardites players
Lowell Grays players